Deutschland. Ein Sommermärchen (Germany. A Summer's Tale) is a 2006 documentary film written, filmed and directed by Sönke Wortmann. The film records the Germany national football team's World Cup 2006 journey, from their boot camp in Sardinia to the third-place play-off with Portugal. The title refers ironically to Heinrich Heine's poem Germany. A Winter's Tale. In contrast to Heine's melancholic view on Germany, Ein Sommermärchen illustrates the sanguine and optimistic atmosphere during the 2006 World Cup.

The film premiered in October 2006, German Unity Day. By the end November 2006, around four million people had seen the film in German cinemas, making it the most commercially successful German documentary film. The film was shown on 6 December 2006 on German public TV channel ARD, and was viewed by more than 10 million people. The DVD was released on 8 February 2007. Parts of the proceeds of the film's merchandising are earmarked for SOS Children's Villages.

External links 
 

Films directed by Sönke Wortmann
German association football films
2006 films
German documentary films
Documentary films about association football
2000s German-language films
2006 documentary films
Germany at the 2006 FIFA World Cup
Germany national football team
2000s English-language films
2000s German films